Zoology is the scientific study of animals.

Zoology may also refer to:

Zoology (journal), a scientific journal established in 1886
Zoology (film), a 2016 Russian drama film directed by Ivan Tverdovsky
Zoology (album), the debut studio album by the Philippine band The Zoo

See also
Animal science, a branch of agriculture
Zoology journal (disambiguation)
List of zoology journals
Zoological Science, a scientific journal published by the Zoological Society of Japan